Třebíčsko Nature Park is a nature park near Třebíč in the Czech Republic. There are many valuable plants. The park was founded in 1982.

Kobylinec and Ptáčovský kopeček

Kobylinec is a nature monument, situated in the municipality of Trnava.
The area of this monument is 0.44 ha. Pulsatilla grandis can be found here and in the Ptáčovský kopeček Nature Monument near the Ptáčov village within Třebíč.

Ponds
In the natural park there are some interesting ponds such as Velký Bor, Malý Bor, Buršík near Přeckov and a brook Březinka. Dams on the brook are examples of European beaver activity.

Syenit rocks near Pocoucov

Syenite rocks near Pocoucov is one of famed locations. There are interesting granite boulders. The area of the reservation is 0.77 ha.

References

Parts of this article or all article was translated from Czech. The original article is :cs:Přírodní park Třebíčsko.

External links
Nature near the village Trnava which is there

Třebíč
Parks in the Czech Republic
Tourist attractions in the Vysočina Region